Zoran Višić (born October 13, 1956) is a Serbian professional basketball coach. He is currently a head coach of the India women's national basketball team.

Coaching career

Men's basketball 
Višić coached the Mladost Zemun of the Serbian B League during 2008–09 season. He coached Singapore Pro-Am team Falcons during 2015–16 season.

Women's club basketball 
Višić coached Beopetrol, Budućnost Podgorica and Spartak of the First Women's League of FR Yugoslavia. In 2001, he had signed for the Romanian team ICIM Arad where he stayed for one season.

Višić was a head coach of the Russian team UMMC Ekaterinburg from 2002 to 2006. He won EuroLeague Women and Russian Women's Premier League in 2002–03 season.

In 2006, he came back to Serbia and signed for the Vojvodina. In November 2006, he became the head coach for the Crvena zvezda. He lost the 2006–07 season Serbian League finals from Hemofarm. In November 2007, he got released as the head coach of the Zvezda. On July 17, 2009, he signed for the Hemofarm. He got fired in February 2010. In 2011, Višić became a head coach of ICIM Arad for his second time.

In October 2016, Višić was named a head coach of the Lebanese Women's First Division team Chabibeh. He left in May 2017.

National teams

Yugoslavia 
Višić was an assistant coach of the FR Yugoslavia/Serbia and Montenegro women's national teams that participated at the EuroBasket Women 1995 and at the EuroBasket Women 2003. He was a head coach of the FR Yugoslavia women's national under-16 team that won silver medal at the 1999 FIBA Europe Under-16 Championship for Women.

India 
On June 1, 2017, Višić was named as a head coach of the India women's national team. He won the gold medal at the 2017 FIBA Women's Asia Cup – Division B. He was a head coach of India women's national under-16 team that won the gold medal at the FIBA Under-16 Women's Asian Championship Division B.

In early November 2017, Višić was named as a head coach of the India men's national team.

Career achievements and awards
 EuroLeague Women champion: 1 (with UMMC Ekaterinburg: 2002–03)
 Russian Women's Premier League champion: 1 (with UMMC Ekaterinburg: 2002–03)
 Russian Women's Cup winner: 1 (with UMMC Ekaterinburg: 2004–05)

See also 
 List of EuroLeague Women winning coaches

References

External links 
 Coach Profile at eurobasket.com
 Biography at promotex.org

1956 births
Living people
KK Mladost Zemun players
KK Mladost Zemun coaches
Serbian men's basketball coaches
Serbian expatriate basketball people in India
Serbian expatriate basketball people in Lebanon
Serbian expatriate basketball people in Montenegro
Serbian expatriate basketball people in Romania
Serbian expatriate basketball people in Russia
Serbian expatriate basketball people in Singapore
University of Belgrade Faculty of Sport and Physical Education alumni
ŽKK Crvena zvezda coaches